Ajai Sanders (born Angela Marrine Wilson; October 1, 1967), is an American actress and stand-up comedian, best known for her supporting role as Gina Deveaux in the sitcom A Different World from 1991 until the series original ending in 1993.

Biography
Born Angela Marie Wilson, Sanders grew up in Dallas, Texas. She attended Hillcrest High School, graduating in 1985. Sanders moved to Los Angeles and began working as a stand-up comic; eventually this work led to what initially was to be a one-time role on A Different World. The guest role was expanded after director Debbie Allen proved impressed by the qualities Sanders brought to the character, whose appearances were expanded to five that season and 18 the following season, after which she was added to the show's opening credits.

Sanders has made guest appearances on the sitcoms Martin, Hangin' with Mr. Cooper, The Fresh Prince of Bel-Air, The Parent 'Hood, The Wayans Brothers, The Jamie Foxx Show, and Moesha. She also guest-starred in a 2001 episode of the Lifetime show, The Division. Sanders had a major role in the independent urban comedy, High Freakquency, in which she was credited as Ajai Richards. She had a smaller role in the Michael Keaton Christmas comedy, Jack Frost, and also appeared in the 2000 urban independent drama, The Playaz Court. She is currently hosting a talk show called Multiple Personalities with Ajai Sanders on Business Bully TV.

Personal
Sanders has been married once and has no children. In May 2002, Sanders married Micheal Brownlee in Denton, Texas. They later divorced in August 2016.

Filmography 
2011: Are We There Yet? as Tamera "Tam" Hensley (season 2, episode 16, 2011)
2001: The Division as Adeen (1 episode, 2001)
2001: Moesha as Lisa (1 episode, 2001)
2000: The Playaz Court as Yolanda
1998: Jack Frost as Renee Thompson
1998: High Freakquency as LaShanda
1997: The Jamie Foxx Show as Irene (1 episode, 1997)
1997: The Wayans Bros. as Amber (1 episode, 1997)
1995: The Fresh Prince Of Bel-Air as Candance (2 episodes) as Jana (1 episode) (3 episodes, 1995)
1995: Hangin' With Mr. Cooper as Denise (3 episodes, 1995)
1993: Martin as Thomasina (1 episode, 1993)
1991–93: A Different World as Gina Deveaux (38 episodes)

Notes

External links 

1967 births
Living people
Actresses from New Jersey
Actors from Trenton, New Jersey
People from Dallas
African-American female comedians
Comedians from New Jersey
American stand-up comedians
American women comedians
20th-century American actresses
21st-century American actresses
American television actresses
African-American actresses
American film actresses
Hillcrest High School (Dallas) alumni
20th-century American comedians
21st-century American comedians
20th-century African-American women
20th-century African-American people
21st-century African-American women
21st-century African-American people